David Arenas Torres (born 16 June 1986) is a Spanish footballer who plays for Callosa Deportiva CF as a striker.

Club career
Born in Alicante, Valencian Community, Torres played lower league football until the age of nearly 26. He started out at local Alicante CF in the Segunda División B, going on to represent Real Murcia Imperial, Ontinyent CF, AD Ceuta and Albacete Balompié.

Torres joined Segunda División club CD Alcoyano in the last minutes of the January 2012 transfer window. He made his debut as a professional on 4 February, coming on as a 62nd-minute substitute in a 2–0 away loss against CD Numancia, and scored his first goal the following round (2–0 home win over UD Las Palmas), but his team ultimately suffered relegation and he was released at the end of the following season.

After two seasons in the Super League Greece with Platanias FC, Torres returned to his country and signed a one-year deal with Deportivo Alavés. With the latter, he achieved promotion to La Liga in 2016 but was rarely used in the process, and terminated his contract on 28 June 2016.

On 5 August 2016, Torres returned to Alcoyano who now competed in the third division. He continued to play in that tier the following years, with Hércules CF, Ontinyent and Salamanca CF UDS.

Torres joined CF La Nucía of Tercera División on 29 June 2019. Only ten days later, he left and signed with amateurs CF Intercity in Sant Joan d'Alacant.

Honours
Alavés
Segunda División: 2015–16

References

External links

1986 births
Living people
Spanish footballers
Footballers from Alicante
Association football forwards
Segunda División players
Segunda División B players
Tercera División players
Tercera Federación players
Divisiones Regionales de Fútbol players
Alicante CF footballers
Real Murcia Imperial players
Ontinyent CF players
AD Ceuta footballers
Albacete Balompié players
CD Alcoyano footballers
Deportivo Alavés players
Hércules CF players
Salamanca CF UDS players
CF La Nucía players
CF Intercity players
Orihuela CF players
Super League Greece players
Platanias F.C. players
Spanish expatriate footballers
Expatriate footballers in Greece
Spanish expatriate sportspeople in Greece